The World Group Play-offs were four ties which involved the losing nations of the World Group first round and the winning nations of the World Group II. Nations that won their play-off ties entered the 2015 World Group, while losing nations joined the 2015 World Group II.

Russia vs. Argentina

Canada vs. Slovakia

United States vs. France

Spain vs. Poland

References 

World Group Play-offs